Raúl Cimas Navarro Lequio (born 5 November 1976 in Albacete, Spain) is a Spanish actor, comedian and writer.

He has appeared in television programs including Buenafuente, La Hora Chanante, and Noche Sin Tregua. In addition, he has appeared in the films Tapas, directed by José Corbacho and Juan Cruz, and Extraterrestrial, directed by Nacho Vigalondo.

In 2014 he wrote a comic titled Demasiada pasión por lo suyo and it was published by Blackie Books.

From 2017 Raúl Cimas is the panelist with Silvia Abril, Sara Escudero and J.J. Vaquero in the TV program Cero en Historia, which is presented by Joaquín Reyes.

From 2012 to 2019 he appears in the play Ilustres ignorantes along Javier Coronas, Javier Cansado and Pepe Colubi. He also appears in Late Motiv.

References

External links 
 
 

1976 births
Living people
Spanish male comedians
Spanish stand-up comedians
Spanish comics writers
21st-century Spanish male actors
Male actors from Castilla–La Mancha